The Minister for Integration (Italian: Ministro per l'Integrazione) in Italy was one of the positions in the Italian government.

The latest Minister for Integration was Cécile Kyenge, who held the office from 28 April 2013 until 22 February 2014.

List of Ministers
 Parties

 Governments

References

Integration